WMVT (channel 36) is a secondary PBS member television station in Milwaukee, Wisconsin, United States. It is owned by Milwaukee Area Technical College alongside primary PBS member WMVS (channel 10). Collectively branded as Milwaukee PBS, the two stations share studios at the Continuing Education Center on the MATC campus on North 8th Street in downtown Milwaukee, and transmitter facilities on North Humboldt Boulevard in Milwaukee's Estabrook Park neighborhood.

WMVT and WMVS operate separately from the PBS Wisconsin state network owned by the University of Wisconsin Extension and serves the rest of the state; however, WMVT runs instructional television programs from PBS Wisconsin, and Milwaukee Area Technical College and Milwaukee PBS coordinate instructional television efforts for their broadcast area.

History

The station first signed on the air on January 28, 1963. It was operated by Milwaukee Vocational and Technical School, forerunner of MATC, alongside WMVS.

Digital television

Analog-to-digital conversion
WMVT shut down its analog signal, over UHF channel 36, at 9 a.m. on June 12, 2009, the official date in which full-power television stations in the United States transitioned from analog to digital broadcasts under federal mandate. The station's digital signal remained on its pre-transition UHF channel 35. Through the use of PSIP, digital television receivers display the station's virtual channel as its former UHF analog channel 36.

WMVT formerly did not have a digital broadcast signal, and the station's channel slot was used to broadcast a full-quality high definition digital signal of WMVS, due to the limitations of the VHF channel 8 signal within the area. WMVS-DT had to operate on limited power until the digital switchover in order to protect the analog channel 8 signal of NBC affiliate WOOD-TV across Lake Michigan in Grand Rapids, Michigan, which regularly propagated over the lake and into Wisconsin. Another shuffle occurred on September 1, 2010 which brought over three of WMVT's subchannel services onto WMVS' bandwidth, along with a standard definition simulcast of WMVS' 10.1 feed over digital channel 36.2 in 480i widescreen standard definition to address viewer complaints about reception of VHF channels post-transition. This shuffle also enabled 36.1 to eventually air programming in high definition beginning on February 7, 2011, a move that was delayed by budget concerns.

Spectrum sale, channel sharing with WMVS
On April 13, 2017, Milwaukee PBS announced that it had participated in the FCC's 2016 spectrum auction and successfully sold the UHF spectrum for WMVT for just under $85 million. On August 31, 2017, WMVT's audio channels on 36.4 and 36.5 featuring classical and jazz formats were discontinued.

Sinclair, Weigel Broadcasting, and Milwaukee PBS all decided on a switch date of January 8, 2018 for their various local spectrum moves, which took place at 9 a.m. that morning. At that time, Milwaukee PBS re-mapped their channels onto physical channel 8, with WMVT retaining their main channel on 36.1 in HD, World moving to 36.2 and MPTV's weather service mapping to 36.3. WMVS then mapped to main service on 10.1 in HD, with Create on 10.2 and PBS Kids remaining on 10.3. In early February 2018, the traffic camera footage formerly carried on 36.6 became a part of 36.3's weather maps/conditions loop.

Programming
While WMVS is billed as the area's mainstream PBS station, WMVT maintains a more educational and news format. The station's schedule is heavy on documentary, instructional, DIY, and news programming. Until October 2014, when the state's instructional programming efforts moved online-only, WMVT functioned as the Milwaukee member for the Wisconsin Educational Communications Board's instructional telecourse programs for students and teachers and most Wisconsin Badgers sports coverage from PBS Wisconsin; British drama and comedy programming, along with encores of Milwaukee PBS and PBS programming has now replaced the instructional programming in the overnight, weekend and morning timeslots. When WMVS holds its annual auction and pledge drives, WMVT takes on the responsibility of running PBS prime time programming normally seen on channel 10. The station also previously aired PBS NewsHour on a half-hour delay in lieu of WMVS for a ten-year period until September 5, 2016, when Milwaukee PBS's locally based programming moved to WMVT.

WMVT also has a "Student Operations Day" held annually on the first Saturday in May, in which students from Milwaukee Area Technical College's broadcasting department use the Milwaukee PBS facilities to produce their own shows to air on channel 36, which vary from serious educational and history programs to comedy shows.

See also 
 Milwaukee PBS

References

External links
 Official website

PBS member stations
Television channels and stations established in 1963
1963 establishments in Wisconsin
Public broadcasting in Wisconsin
MVT